The 2016 Esiliiga is the 26th season of the Esiliiga, second-highest Estonian league for association football clubs, since its establishment in 1992. The season began on 25 February 2016 and concluded on 6 November 2016.

Tulevik won the league, finishing with 89 points and were promoted to the Meistriliiga. It was their first Esiliiga title in history.

Teams

Stadia

Personnel and kits

Managerial changes

Results

League table

Result tables

First half of the season

Second half of the season

Play-offs

Promotion play-offs
Maardu Linnameeskond, who finished 4th, faced Pärnu Linnameeskond, the 9th-placed 2016 Meistriliiga side for a two-legged play-off. The winner on aggregate score after both matches earned entry into the 2017 Meistriliiga.

First leg

Second leg

Pärnu Linnameeskond won 9–4 on aggregate and retained their Meistriliiga spot for the 2017 season.

Relegation play-offs
Nõmme Kalju U21, who finished 8th, faced Welco, 3rd-placed 2016 Esiliiga B side for a two-legged play-off. The first leg originally ended 3–2 to Nõmme Kalju U21 but they were later ruled to have forfeited the match after fielding an ineligible player Henrik Pürg. According to the rules, the second leg was cancelled and Welco earned entry into the 2017 Esiliiga.

First leg

Second leg

Season statistics

Top goalscorers

Awards

Monthly awards

Esiliiga Player of the Year
Eduard Golovljov was named Esiliiga Player of the Year.

See also
 2015–16 Estonian Cup
 2016–17 Estonian Cup
 2016 Meistriliiga
 2016 Esiliiga B

References

External links
Official website

Esiliiga seasons
2
Estonia
Estonia